Arak Amornsupasiri (born 2 September 1984), nicknamed Pae, is a Thai musician and actor. He began his musical career as guitarist for the indie rock band Slur, before releasing his first album as a solo singer in 2010. He began acting in the 2007 film Body, and has starred in several films, including Best of Times (2009) and By the Time It Gets Dark (2016). His career also includes television acting and modelling.

Discography

Albums

Singles

TV Dramas

TV Series

TV Sitcom

Film

Master of Ceremony: MC ON TV

Music video

ฺBook
 สิ่งที่สวยงามมักจะอยู่ไกลออกไป

References

Arak Amornsupasiri
Arak Amornsupasiri
Arak Amornsupasiri
Arak Amornsupasiri
Arak Amornsupasiri
Arak Amornsupasiri
Arak Amornsupasiri
1984 births
Living people